The following are the national records in athletics in Mauritania maintained by Mauritania's national athletics federation: Federation d'Athletisme R.I Mauritanie (FARIM).

Outdoor

Key to tables:

ht = hand timing

# = not officially ratified by federation

Men

Women

Indoor

Men

Women

References

External links

Mauritania
Records
Athletics